Sergio Caropreso (born 30 November 1961) is an Italian rower. He competed in the men's coxless four event at the 1988 Summer Olympics.

References

1961 births
Living people
Italian male rowers
Olympic rowers of Italy
Rowers at the 1988 Summer Olympics
Place of birth missing (living people)